National Route 501 is a national highway of Japan connecting between Omuta, Fukuoka and Uto, Kumamoto in Japan, with total length has 47.1 km (29.3 mi).

References

501
Roads in Fukuoka Prefecture
Roads in Kumamoto Prefecture